A sock is a piece of clothing worn on the feet and often covering the ankle or some part of the calf. Some types of shoes or boots are typically worn over socks. In ancient times, socks were made from leather or matted animal hair. In the late 16th century, machine-knit socks were first produced. Until the 1800s, both hand-made and machine-knit socks were manufactured, with the latter technique becoming more common in the 19th century.

One of the roles of socks is absorbing perspiration. In cold environments, socks made from cotton or wool help warm up cold feet which in turn helps decrease the risk of getting frostbite. Thin socks are most commonly worn in the summer months to keep feet cool. Light colored socks are typically worn with sports shoes and dark colored socks with dress shoes (often black or navy blue dress socks).

Etymology 
The modern English word sock is derived from the Old English word socc, meaning "light slipper". This comes from the Latin soccus, a term to describe a "light, low-heeled shoe" worn by Roman comic actors, and deriving from the Ancient Greek word sykchos.

History 

Socks have evolved over the centuries from the earliest models, which were made from animal skins gathered up and tied around the ankles. Because the manufacture of socks was relatively time-consuming in pre-industrial times, they were long used only by the rich. The poor wore footwraps, simple cloths wrapped around the feet. These remained in use in Eastern European armies until the end of the 20th century.

According to the Greek poet Hesiod, in the 8th century BC, the Ancient Greeks wore socks called "piloi", which were made from matted animal hair. The Romans also wrapped their feet with leather or woven fabrics. Around the 2nd century AD, the Romans started sewing the fabrics together making fitted socks called "udones". By the 5th century AD, socks called "puttees" were worn by holy people in Europe to symbolize purity.

During the Middle Ages, the length of trousers was extended and the sock became a tight, brightly colored cloth covering the lower part of the leg. Since socks did not have an elastic band, garters were placed over the top of the stockings to prevent them from falling down. When breeches became shorter, socks began to get longer (and more expensive). By 1000 AD, socks became a symbol of wealth among the nobility. From the 16th century onwards, an ornamental design on the ankle or side of a sock has been called a "clock".

The invention of a knitting machine in 1589 meant that socks could be knitted six times faster than by hand. Nonetheless, knitting machines and hand knitters worked side by side until 1800.

The next revolution in sock production was the introduction of nylon in 1938. Until then socks were commonly made from silk, cotton and wool. Nylon was the start of blending two or more yarns in the production of socks, a process that still continues today.

Fabrication 
Socks can be created from a wide variety of materials, such as cotton, wool, nylon, acrylic, polyester, olefins (such as polypropylene).  To get an increased level of softness other materials that might be used during the process can be silk, bamboo, linen, cashmere, or mohair.  The color variety of socks can be any color that the designers intend to make the sock upon its creation.   Sometimes art is also put onto socks to improve their appearance. Colored socks may be a key part of the uniforms for sports, allowing players teams to be distinguished when only their legs are clearly visible.

Fort Payne, Alabama, is regarded as the "Sock capital of the world" due to nearly half of socks manufactured in the early 21st century were made here. The Fort Payne sock industry employed about 7000 workers at its peak around 2000 AD. Fort Payne, while still one of the largest producers of socks only produces only a quarter of socks, has lost that title to Datang.

The township-level district of Datang in the city of Zhuji in Zhejiang Province, People's Republic of China, has become known as Sock City. The town currently produces 8 billion pairs of socks each year, a third of the world's sock production, effectively creating two pairs of socks for every person on the planet in 2011.

Styles 

Socks are manufactured in a variety of lengths. No show, low cut, and ankle socks extend to the ankle or lower and are often worn casually or for athletic use. No show and low-cut socks are designed to create the look of bare feet when worn with shoes (sock not visible). Knee-high socks are sometimes associated with formal dress or as being part of a uniform, such as in sports (like football and baseball) or as part of a school's dress code or youth group's uniform. Over-the-knee socks or socks that extend higher (thigh-high socks) are sometimes referred to as female garments in the common era. They were widely worn by children, both boys and girls, during the late 19th and early 20th centuries; although, the popularity varied widely from country to country. When worn by adult females, knee-high or thigh-high socks can become the object of sexual attraction and fetishism by some men. Liner socks are socks which are worn underneath another sock with the intention being to prevent blisters.

Toe socks encases each toe individually the same way a finger is encased in a glove, while other socks have one compartment for the big toe and one for the rest, like a mitten; most notably what Japanese call tabi while other parts of the world simply call it split toe socks. Both of these allow one to wear flip-flops with the socks.

Leg warmers, which are not typically socks, may be replaced with socks in cold climates and are similar to leggings due to the fact that they typically only keep legs warm in cold weather but not the entire foot.

A business sock or dress sock is a term for a dark-colored sock (typically black or navy blue) for formal or casual footwear. It is often loosely referred to as a work sock or a formal sock for formal occasions, for example, weddings, funerals, graduation ceremonies, prom, church, or work.

Crew socks are short and thick or thin everyday socks. Those socks are usually ribbed at the top of the ankles. They can be used in a way to warm legs if pulled all the way up. The first familiar practice of crew socks was in 1948. Crew socks are usually unisex.

A low cut sock is a kind of sock that describe in a way to be cut below the ankle. Low cut socks are formed to cover the contours of a person's feet. Although low cut socks are unisex, women and girls commonly use them. Low cut socks are normally worn with shoes such as boat shoes, Oxfords, moccasins and loafers.

The Ancient Egyptian style of sock is a blend between modern Western socks and Japanese tabi, both of which it predates. Like tabi, Egyptian socks have one compartment for the big toe and another for the rest, permitting their use with sandals. Like Western socks, they fit snugly to the foot and do not use fasteners like tabi.

Sizes 

Although generally holding to a pattern of being divided into sizes of small-medium-large, etc., what range of shoe sizes those sock sizes correspond to carries in different markets.  Some size standards are coordinated by standard-setting bodies but others have arisen from custom. Sock lengths vary, from ankle-high to thigh level.

Sports 

Most sports require some sort of sock, usually a knee length or mid-calf sock to protect one's legs from being scraped while participating in sport activities. In basketball, tube socks are worn, and in lacrosse, mid-calf socks are required. In football, knee socks are used. They are mostly to stop grass burns.

Other uses of the word 
The layer of leather or other material covering the insole of a shoe is also referred to as a sock. When only part of the insole is covered, leaving the forepart visible, this is known as a half-sock.

Footwraps

Footwraps, pieces of cloth that are worn wrapped around the feet, were worn with boots before socks became widely available. They remained in use by armies in Eastern Europe until the beginning of the 21st century.

Thermal socks
For use in cold environments, thermal socks are thicker. They are commonly worn for skiing, skating, and other winter sports. They provide not only insulation, but also greater padding due to their thickness.

Diabetic socks are a kind of thermal sock made from an acrylic, cotton, nylon, and elastic. These are made to improve comfort while at the same time keeping feet cool and dry. However, there is no solid evidence that they are helpful.

Holiday items 

A sock is also used as a holiday item during Christmas. Children hang a large ceremonial sock called a Christmas stocking by a nail or hook on Christmas Eve, and then their parents fill it with small presents while the recipients are asleep. According to tradition, Santa Claus brings these presents to well-behaved children, while naughty kids instead receive coal.

Religion
Among Muslims, socks have initiated a discussion about the intricacies of wudhu, the formal washing carried out before prayer. Some Muslim clerics, mindful of possible hardship among Muslims in inhospitable circumstances, have issued Muslim edicts permitting practicing Muslims to wipe water over their sock or sprinkle their sock. This would allow prayer where there are no seating facilities, or if there is a queue. This is the stated opinion especially of Maliki Sunnis.

See also 
 Beoseon (traditional Korean socks)
 Civil War sock campaign
 Leg warmer
 Leggings
 Loose sock
 Missing sock
 Puttee
 Stocking
 Tights
 Sock puppet
 Socks and sandals
 Smelly socks
 Tabi

References

External links 

 

 
Footwear accessories
Hosiery
History of clothing